Sir Arthur Selborne Jelf, CMG (10 October 1876 – 26 February 1947) was a British colonial administrator. He should not be confused with his relative, the English judge Sir Arthur Richard Jelf.

Biography 

The son of the Rev Dr George Edward Jelf, Master of Charterhouse, Arthur Selborne Jelf was educated Marlborough College and Exeter College, Oxford. He served in the Malayan Civil Service from 1899 to 1925, with a break from 1917 to 1919 during which he was seconded for military service in intelligence work. He was transferred to Jamaica in 1925 as Colonial Secretary, and held the post until his retirement in 1935. On several occasions he was acting Governor of Jamaica.

After his retirement, Jelf returned to England, where was a member of Hythe Borough Council from 1936 to 1940, and was Mayor of Hythe from 1938 to 1939.

Jelf was appointed CMG in 1927 and knighted in 1932.

Family 
Jelf firstly married Blanche (died 1917), daughter of John Connell. He married secondly Evelyn Mary, daughter of A. E. Hardcastle; they had two sons and one daughter.

References 

1876 births
1947 deaths
British colonial governors and administrators in Asia
British colonial governors and administrators in the Americas
Alumni of Exeter College, Oxford
People educated at Marlborough College
Companions of the Order of St Michael and St George
Knights Bachelor